Egbert Erle Cocke, Jr. (May 10, 1921April 23, 2000) was an American businessman and highly decorated World War II veteran who served as the 33rd National Commander of The American Legion from 1950 to 1951.

Early life and education 
A native of Dawson, Georgia, Cocke was the son of Egbert Erle and India Elise ( Meadows) Cocke. He graduated from the University of Georgia (A.B., class of 1942), where he was a member of the Phi Kappa Literary Society. In 1947, he received an M.B.A. from Harvard University. In later years Cocke received a total of three honorary doctorates from various universities.

World War II 
Cocke was commissioned in the United States Army in 1942 and served in World War II. Later in 1951, when President Harry S. Truman relieved General of the Army Douglas MacArthur of his duties during the Korean War, Cocke would voice his support of MacArthur. Awards received during World War II include the Silver Star, the Bronze Star Medal, Purple Heart with three oak leaf clusters, and Croix de Guerre of France.

The American Legion 
Cocke served as the 33rd National Commander of The American Legion from 1950 to 1951. At age 29, He became the youngest person to command the Legion, the U.S.' largest wartime veterans' organization.

Career 
Cocke was a banking consultant and lobbyist who did considerable work in business management and public relations. He co-founded Cocke & Phillips International Corporation, a banking consulting and lobbying firm founded in Washington, D.C. After serving as an aide to Secretary of State George Marshall and Secretary of Defense Robert A. Lovett, he was appointed a U.S. delegate to the United Nations General Assembly by President Dwight D. Eisenhower in 1959. Cocke held a position in the International Bank for Reconstruction and Development during the administrations of Presidents John F. Kennedy and Lyndon B. Johnson. In 1964 and 1966, Cocke ran unsuccessfully for the Democratic nomination for a seat in the United States House of Representatives to represent Georgia's 3rd congressional district.

Personal life 
Cocke married Madelyn Grotnes on May 28, 1955 in Chicago. She had been a private secretary to Senator Joseph McCarthy. The couple had three daughters – Elise Carol Cocke, Jennifer Aline Cocke (Mrs. Gregg Carpenter), and Carolyn Laurine Cocke (Mrs. Jeffrey M. Whitsett) – and a son (Egbert Erle Cocke, III), who died. Both Cocke and his wife Madelyn are buried in Arlington National Cemetery.

See also 
 List of Harvard University people
 List of people from Georgia (U.S. state)
 List of University of Georgia people

References

Further reading

External links 

 

1921 births
2000 deaths
20th-century American businesspeople
20th-century Baptists
Baptists from Georgia (U.S. state)
Burials at Arlington National Cemetery
Businesspeople from Georgia (U.S. state)
Deaths from pancreatic cancer
Harvard Business School alumni
Farmers from Georgia (U.S. state)
Kennedy administration personnel
Lyndon B. Johnson administration personnel
National Commanders of the American Legion
National Guard (United States) generals
People from Dawson, Georgia
Recipients of the Croix de Guerre 1939–1945 (France)
Recipients of the Silver Star
United States Army officers
United States Army personnel of World War II
University of Georgia alumni